Koyama (also known as Kunyama Kundeeq) (also spelled Kwayama and Coiama) is an island in southern Somalia, in the region of Jubaland. 

Koyama is the second largest island of the Bajuni Islands archipelago in the Somali sea, situated only  from the mainland coast of Somalia. At , it is almost equal in size to Chula, which measures . Koyama island has two separate villages, Koyama and Koyamani. Koyama is rich in Swahili historic ruins and monuments such as pillar tombs.

Demographics
The island are today mainly inhabited by the Bajuni people. All Bajuni inhabitants of Koyama belong to the Nowfali sub-clan.

See also
List of islands by name (K)

References

Islands of Somalia
Islands of the Indian Ocean
Somali Sea